The 2011 La Manga Cup was an exhibition international club football (soccer) competition featuring football club teams from Europe, which was held in February 2011. All matches were played in La Manga Stadium in La Manga, Spain. This was the fourteenth La Manga Cup. The tournament was won by Viking, who beat Start on goal differential after both clubs finished with identical records of two wins and one draw.

Teams 
The following 8 clubs participated in the 2011 tournament:

 FC Midtjylland from the Danish Superliga in Denmark
 Esbjerg fB from the Danish Superliga in Denmark
 Randers FC from the Danish Superliga in Denmark
 Kalmar FF from the Allsvenskan in Sweden
 Strømsgodset from Tippeligaen in Norway
 Viking from Tippeligaen in Norway
 Odd Grenland from Tippeligaen in Norway
 Start from Tippeligaen in Norway

Standings
With eight teams entered, the 2011 version of the Cup was contested in a Round Robin style format, wherein each participating team played against three of the other seven teams entered in the competition, with the winner determined by points earned.

Matches

References

2011
2010–11 in Danish football
2011 in Swedish football
2011 in Norwegian football